Sportsperson of the Year is a trophy awarded to the best Slovak athletes by the Club of Sports Journalists of the Slovak Syndicate of Journalists. The trophy was founded in 1993, following the annual award Czechoslovak Sportsperson of the Year, which was finished after the dissolution of Czechoslovakia.

So far the individual trophy has been awarded to 8 different athletes, among which there were 6 men and 2 women (as of 2008). The most successful athletes were Martina Moravcová (swimmer), who achieved it 6 times, and Michal Martikán (slalom canoeist), who won 4 times. The team trophy has been achieved by teams of 5 different sports disciplines (as of 2008). The most successful were K4 kayakers, who received it 6 times, and ice hockey players, who won 5 times.

2017

Individual awards

Team awards

See also
 Sportsperson of the Year (Czechoslovakia)

References

Sport in Slovakia
Slovakia
Awards established in 1993
1993 establishments in Slovakia
Annual events in Slovakia